Francy Rädelt, also written as Francy Raedelt, (born 15 May 1996) is a German freestyle wrestler. She won the silver medal in the women's 76 kg event at the 2019 European Games held in Minsk, Belarus.

Career 

In October 2021, she competed in the women's 76 kg event at the World Wrestling Championships held in Oslo, Norway where she was eliminated in her first match.

In 2022, she won one of the bronze medals in the women's 76 kg event at the Yasar Dogu Tournament held in Istanbul, Turkey. She competed in the 76 kg event at the 2022 European Wrestling Championships held in Budapest, Hungary where she was eliminated in her first match.

A few months later, she competed at the Matteo Pellicone Ranking Series 2022 held in Rome, Italy. She was eliminated in her first match in the 76 kg event at the 2022 World Wrestling Championships held in Belgrade, Serbia.

She won one of the bronze medals in the women's 76kg event at the Grand Prix de France Henri Deglane 2023 held in Nice, France.

Achievements

References

External links 
 

Living people
1996 births
Place of birth missing (living people)
German female sport wrestlers
Wrestlers at the 2019 European Games
European Games silver medalists for Germany
European Games medalists in wrestling
21st-century German women